The South Line, also known as the Main Line and sometimes the North/South Line or the North–South Line, is a freight rail corridor connecting Hobart to the northern ports of Tasmania. The Railway Line was built by the Tasmanian Main Line Company.

History
When building the railway Line the company had limited finances, the line was built to the  Narrow Gauge and included long sections of steep gradients and sharp curves. The final eighteen kilometres of the route from Western Junction to Launceston used the existing Broad gauge alignment of the Launceston and Western Railway, with a third rail being laid for use by the narrow gauge trains. The Railway Line was officially opened on 1 November 1876. As Tasmania has a very competitive road transport industry and a modern road network, only limited deviations have been built in the Main line's 125-year history. Although the line still follows the original alignment, the standard of the track has improved by the use of heavier rail welded into long lengths, steel sleepers and better ballast. The line remains in service, and sees multiple freight trains most days, these generally operating Burnie to Boyer and Burnie / Launceston to Hobart and return.

The last freight train left Hobart Station on 22 June 2014; afterwards the purpose-built Brighton Transport Hub became the terminus.

Route
The line commences at the Hobart intermodal Terminal at Maquarie Point, on Hobart's waterfront. The line follows the western side of the River Derwent to Bridgewater, where the river is crossed by the Bridgewater Bridge. From here the line runs generally north east through easy country to Rekuna (between Tea Tree and Campania). From here the often steep and/or twisty climb commences, with little respite for train crews until Rhyndaston and its 1200m long tunnel is passed, some 28 km later.
The descent from near Parattah is not as steep or severe as its southern counterpart, although does still include a number of difficult sections including the Tin Dish and Nala deviations which were constructed in the 1930s to lessen gradients, although at the expense of more additional curvature in some sections.
North of Antill Ponds, the line roughly parallels the Midland Highway as they both follow the agriculturally rich valley's formed by the Macquarie and South Esk rivers. The South Line finishes at Western Junction near Evandale, where it connects with the Western Line.

Future

Since the completion of the Brighton Transport Hub, the section of rail line through inner Hobart has fallen into disuse. Serious constraints in the road network, along with low-frequency bus services, have led to ongoing discussion of introducing light rail to Hobart. It would make use of the rail corridor, creating a new express route to Hobart. The proposed light rail system is known as both Riverline and the Northern Suburbs Railway.

See also

Rail transport in Tasmania

References

Railway lines in Tasmania
Southern Tasmania
Railway lines opened in 1876
3 ft 6 in gauge railways in Australia
1876 establishments in Australia